{{Taxobox
| name = Pseudocochliobolus eragrostidis
| regnum = Fungi
| phylum = Ascomycota
| classis = Dothideomycetes
| subclassis = Pleosporomycetidae
| ordo = Pleosporales
| familia = Pleosporaceae
| genus = Pseudocochliobolus
| species = P. eragrostidis
| binomial = Pseudocochliobolus eragrostidis
| binomial_authority = Tsuda & Ueyama, (1985)
| synonyms =
Brachysporium eragrostidis' Henn., (1908)Cochliobolus eragrostidis' (Tsuda & Ueyama) Sivan., (1987)
Curvularia eragrostidis' (Henn.) J.A. Mey., (1959)Curvularia maculans' (C.K. Bancr.) Boedijn, (1933)
Spondylocladium maculans' C.K. Bancr., (1913)
}}Pseudocochliobolus eragrostidis'' is a plant pathogen infecting commelinids (banana, maize, pineapple).

References

External links 
 Index Fungorum
 USDA ARS Fungal Database

Fungal plant pathogens and diseases
Banana diseases
Fungal fruit diseases
Maize diseases
Monocot diseases
Pleosporaceae